The Royal Canadian Pancake Houses were moderately priced gourmet pancake houses in New York City and in the South Beach area of Miami Beach, Florida.

Development 
The Royal Canadian Pancake Houses were owned by Royal Canadian Foods Corp, a Delaware corporation. The first outlet opened in Tribeca in New York City, in 1989. It was followed by the opening of a second location in Midtown Manhattan. In November 1993, the founders, Sheldon Golumbia and Beatrice Puja, took it public with a micro-public offering of 250,000 shares of common stock at a sale price of $5.00/share.
Subsequently, two more locations were opened in NYC, in the Upper West Side and Gramercy. In Miami Beach, Florida, Royal Canadian Foods also opened a Royal Canadian Pancake House and a Womlette House, featuring “womlettes” (an omelet with a waffle base).

In fall 1998, Royal Canadian Foods closed all of their outlets.

See also
 List of pancake houses

References 

Restaurants in New York City
Regional restaurant chains in the United States
Defunct restaurant chains in the United States
Restaurants established in 1989
Pancake houses
1989 establishments in New York City